Heinz Starke (27 February 1911 – 31 January 2001) was a German politician. He was born in Schweidnitz, Silesia. He was Minister of Finance of the Federal Republic of Germany from 1961–62. He was a member of the Bundestag from 1953 to 1980 representing the district of Hof from 1953 to 1957 and Bayreuth from 1976 to 1980.

References
 Heinz Starke

1911 births
2001 deaths
Finance ministers of Germany
People from Świdnica
People from the Province of Silesia
Commanders Crosses of the Order of Merit of the Federal Republic of Germany
Nazi Party members